Crenna may refer to:
 Richard Crenna (1926-2003), American motion picture, television, and radio actor
 , a frazione of Gallarate, Province of Varese, Italy